Brae of Achnahaird (Achadh na h-Àirde) is a small settlement at the head of Achnahaird Bay in Achiltibuie, Ullapool in Ross-shire, Scottish Highlands and is in the Scottish council area of Highland. The headland of Rubha Coigeach lies approximately 4 miles  to the north west.

References

Populated places in Ross and Cromarty